Borea was the name of at least two ships of the Italian Navy and may refer to:

 , a  launched in 1902 and sunk in 1917.
 , a  launched in 1927 and sunk in 1940.

Italian Navy ship names